The 2022–23 Alabama State Hornets basketball team represented Alabama State University in the 2022–23 NCAA Division I men's basketball season. The Hornets, led by first-year head coach Tony Madlock, played their home games at the Dunn–Oliver Acadome in Montgomery, Alabama as members of the Southwestern Athletic Conference.

Previous season
The Hornets finished the 2021–22 season 9–21, 8–10 in SWAC play to finish in a tie for eighth place. They failed to qualify for the SWAC tournament.

On April 9, after just two years as the helm, head coach Mo Williams announced his resignation. Two days later, on April 11, South Carolina State head coach Tony Madlock, was announced as the Hornets' next head coach.

Roster

Schedule and results

|-
!colspan=12 style=| Exhibition

|-
!colspan=12 style=| Non-conference regular season

|-
!colspan=12 style=| SWAC regular season

Sources

References

Alabama State Hornets basketball seasons
Alabama State Hornets
Alabama State Hornets basketball
Alabama State Hornets basketball